Gordon J. "Pete" McCann (1908 – January 18, 2000) was a Canadian Thoroughbred horse trainer. He was born in East York, now part of the city of Toronto. Known to his family as Gordon, in racing circles he was nicknamed Pete.

Pete McCann began his career as a jockey. He raced at  Oriental Park Racetrack in Havana, Cuba where he was a leading jockey in 1926. He rode with success in Toronto then in 1940 took out his trainer's license and won his first King's Plate that same year with Willie the Kid.

McCann was hired by E. P. Taylor as head trainer at Windfields Farm in 1950 where he would spend the next twenty-one years. During his training career, McCann conditioned seven Canadian Hall of Fame horses and six horses that won Canadian Horse of the Year honours including Canadian Triple Crown winners New Providence in 1959 and Canebora in 1963. He also trained six winners of Canada's most prestigious race, the Queen's Plate and overall won seventeen races that now comprise the Canadian Classics. He also is tied for having trained the most winners with three in the Canadian International Stakes.

In 1971, McCann retired from training after Taylor divided the stable into Canadian and United States divisions under separate head trainers.  Quickly bored, he returned to racing with a small stable of his own.

McCann was inducted into the Canadian Horse Racing Hall of Fame in 1979. He died of pneumonia at age 91.

References
 Gordon J. McCann at the Canadian Horse Racing and Hall of Fame
 January 20, 2000 Thoroughbred Times.com article titled Top trainer McCann dead
 Windfields Farm online

Canadian horse trainers
Canadian Horse Racing Hall of Fame inductees
Sportspeople from Toronto
People from East York, Toronto
1908 births
2000 deaths